Africa Town is 2022 fiction novel written by Irene Latham and Charles Waters.

References

2022 novels